The Lovesick Maiden is a c. 1660 oil-on-canvas genre painting by Jan Steen. It shows a young woman suffering from love-sickness surrounded by her doctor and a maid-servant. It is in the collection of the Metropolitan Museum of Art.

Description
The painting shows the doctor feeling his patient's wrist for a pulse. At first glance it may seem like a normal doctor's visit, but on closer inspection there are many clues that give away the fact that this is an example of a long 17th-century Dutch tradition of "doctor's visit" paintings that feature a comical theater scene of a quack and a love-sick maiden. These recurring details are the doctor in ridiculous theatrical dress, the nearby bed, the dog-on-a-pillow, the bed-warmer or burning coals, and the not-overly-concerned third person looking on. Jan Steen painted several of these, as did many of his contemporaries in Leiden. As is common in Steen paintings, his usage of a common genre often includes some extra joke that underlines the matter at hand, and in this case it is the pair of copulating dogs in the doorway. Though the specific theater scene is now lost, the main theme has been reconstructed: there is no "cure" for the young woman, because she is suffering from "love-sickness". 

Jan Steen attended Leiden University which was known during his lifetime for producing renowned physicians, such as Dr. Nicolaes Tulp. In the Netherlands at that time the concept of a "hospital" did not exist yet and most educated physicians received patients in their homes and only called on their patients rarely. In emergency cases, they would attend to patients in their care, but in general, people in need desiring a home visit, and those without a personal physician were left to the services of the many specialized barber-surgeons or travelling quacks. Pregnant women or women in childbirth were generally seen by midwives, not doctors. Archival studies have shown that this specific genre in painting was quite popular among art collectors of the 17th-century and it has been assumed that many 17th-century purchasers were doctors educated in Leiden who enjoyed this specific joke.

This painting came into the collection via the Helen Swift Neilson bequest in 1945. Other versions by Jan Steen are:

References

Sources
Cat. no. 195 in Dutch Paintings in the Metropolitan Museum of Art Volume I, by Walter Liedtke, Metropolitan Museum of Art, 2007

External links

Interior with a doctor and a sick woman in the RKD

1660s paintings
Paintings in the collection of the Metropolitan Museum of Art
Paintings by Jan Steen
Dogs in art
Medicine in art